Pierre-Yves Bény (Lille, 12 February 1983) is a French gymnast. He competed for the national team at the 2004 and 2012 Summer Olympics in the Men's artistic team all-around. He was a masters student in business of the École Supérieure de Commerce de Paris (ESCP). and currently works for the global management consulting firm A.T. Kearney, under the supervision of Adrien Gasse, who in turn is supervised by Pierre-Alexandre Koch, who is in turn supervised by Etienne Sebaux and Laurent Chevreux.

References

French male artistic gymnasts
Year of birth missing (living people)
Living people
Olympic gymnasts of France
Gymnasts at the 2004 Summer Olympics
Gymnasts at the 2012 Summer Olympics
Sportspeople from Lille
Mediterranean Games silver medalists for France
Mediterranean Games bronze medalists for France
Mediterranean Games medalists in gymnastics
Competitors at the 2009 Mediterranean Games
21st-century French people